Admiral Sir John Devereux Treacher,  (23 September 1924 – 30 April 2018) was a senior officer in the Royal Navy who served as Commander-in-Chief Fleet from 1975 to 1977.

Naval career
Educated at St Paul's School, Treacher was commissioned into the Royal Navy in 1941. He served in the Second World War and escaped the sinking of his ship. He trained as a naval aviator and flew Supermarine Seafire with 800 Naval Air Squadron in the Korean War. He was promoted to captain in 1962 and went on to command . He was appointed Vice Chief of the Naval Staff in 1973 and Commander-in-Chief Fleet in 1975. He retired in 1977.

Business career
In retirement Treacher became Chief Executive of National Car Parks. He was also Deputy Chairman of Westland Group and a Director of Meggitt. He was named chairman of London's Playboy Club in an attempt to secure a gambling licence that had been denied over concerns regarding his predecessor.

Treacher died in April 2018 at the age of 93.

Family
In 1950 Treacher married Patcie McGrath; they had one son and one daughter. After his first marriage was dissolved, he married Kirsteen Forbes in 1969; they also had one son and one daughter.

References

Sources

 Thomas, Graham The Story of the Men of the Fleet Air Arm, RAF & Commonwealth Who Defended South Korea 1950–1953, Grubb Street, 2004, 
 Treacher, John Life at Full Throttle: The Memoirs of Admiral Sir John Treacher, Leo Cooper, 2004, 

|-

1924 births
2018 deaths
British chief executives
Knights Commander of the Order of the Bath
People educated at St Paul's School, London
Royal Navy admirals
Royal Navy officers of World War II
Royal Navy personnel of the Korean War